Nathaniel Silsbee (January 14, 1773July 14, 1850) was a ship master, merchant and American politician from Salem, Massachusetts.

Early career 

Silsbee was the eldest child of Capt. Nathaniel and Sarah (Becket) Silsbee. At the age of fourteen, to support his family upon the financial failures of his father, he went to sea and learned navigation. His able seamanship won him, at the age of nineteen, command of Elias Hasket Derby's Sloop "Sally". Silsbee continued commanding Derby vessels and had many interesting adventures and exploits with privateers, French Consuls, and such.
 In 1795 he became part owner of the Schooner "Betsy" and continued to prosper and master his own vessels. In 1801 he placed his brothers, William and Zachariah, in charge of his ships. Nathaniel continued owning vessels in partnerships until the 1840s, but he actively retired from shipping when he commenced his political career.

Nathaniel married Mary Crowninshield, the daughter of one of Salem's wealthiest merchants, on December 12, 1802. Their son Nathaniel was mayor of Salem from 1849 to 1850 and from 1858 to 1859.

Political career 

Silsbee was elected to the United States House of Representatives and served two terms from March 4, 1817, to March 3, 1821, during which time he was chairman of the U.S. House Committee on Military Pensions in the Twenty-first Congress. He declined to be a candidate for renomination in 1820, choosing to serve in the Massachusetts House of Representatives instead. After one term, he was elected to the Massachusetts Senate, where he served as president from 1823 to 1825. He was a presidential elector in 1824.

He was elected to the United States Senate in 1826 to fill the vacancy in the term ending March 3, 1829, caused by the resignation of James Lloyd. He was re-elected in 1829 and served from May 31, 1826, to March 3, 1835.  He was chairman of the U.S. Senate Committee on Commerce in the Twenty-third Congress. He was a Whig presidential elector in 1836.

Retirement
Silsbee resumed mercantile pursuits in Salem, where he died; interment in The Burying Point, the second oldest cemetery in the US.

Legacy
The town of Silsbee, Texas, is named for him. The Nathaniel Silsbee House is a historic building in Salem, maintained by the Knights of Columbus.

See also
 44th Massachusetts General Court (1823-1824)

References

External links
 

1773 births
1850 deaths
Massachusetts state senators
Presidents of the Massachusetts Senate
Members of the Massachusetts House of Representatives
United States senators from Massachusetts
Massachusetts National Republicans
Democratic-Republican Party United States senators
Massachusetts Whigs
19th-century American politicians
Massachusetts Federalists
Democratic-Republican Party members of the United States House of Representatives from Massachusetts
Colonial American merchants
People from Salem, Massachusetts